Muthirapuzha River is one of the major tributaries of the Periyar River, the longest river in Kerala state south India. It begins in remote forests above the Pooyamkutty- Edamalayar valley in Ernakulam district of Kerala, and joins the Periyar at Kunchithanny

See also
 Periyar River - Main river

Other major tributaries of Periyar river
Mullayar 
Cheruthoni 
Perinjankutti 
Edamalayar

Rivers of Idukki district
Periyar (river)